Most Pure Heart Of Mary Church is a historic church at West Street and Raymond Avenue in Shelby, Ohio.

It was built in 1924 and added to the National Register of Historic Places in 1978.

References

Churches in the Roman Catholic Diocese of Toledo
Churches on the National Register of Historic Places in Ohio
Romanesque Revival church buildings in Ohio
Roman Catholic churches completed in 1924
Churches in Richland County, Ohio
National Register of Historic Places in Richland County, Ohio
20th-century Roman Catholic church buildings in the United States